Randolph Township is a former township in Burlington County, New Jersey, United States, that lasted for 23 years after splitting off from and being reannexed by Washington Township, Burlington County, New Jersey.

Randolph was incorporated as a township by an Act of the New Jersey Legislature on March 17, 1870, from portions of Washington Township and was reannexed to Washington Township on March 28, 1893.

References

1870 establishments in New Jersey
1893 disestablishments in New Jersey
Former townships in New Jersey
Geography of Burlington County, New Jersey
Populated places in the Pine Barrens (New Jersey)
Populated places established in 1870